The Women's League, also known as the PostFinance Women's League for sponsorship reasons, is the top ice hockey league in the Swiss Women's Hockey League (SWHL) system. During 2014 to 2019, the league was called the Swiss Women's Hockey League A, abbreviated SWHL A; the abbreviation continues to be used by the league following the 2019 name change.

History 
With the creation of several women's ice hockey clubs in the early 1980s, the Swiss Ice Hockey Federation chose to incorporate women's hockey within the scope of its governance in 1984. During the 1985–86 season, an unofficial club championship was played. The following season, the first official championship tournament, called  ('Performance Class A'), was organized and the victors, the Kloten Specials of EHC Kloten, became the first Swiss Champions in women's ice hockey.

Two years later, league rules were changed to allow foreign players and several big names in international women's hockey opted to play with Swiss teams, including Canadian national team forwards Andria Hunter and France Saint-Louis, and Finnish national team phenom Riikka Sallinen. The arrival of imports coincided with the rise to dominance of SC Lyss, who won four titles in five years from 1991–92 to 1996–97. The women's section had become an independent club, the DHC Lyss, when they won their fourth title in 1997.

From the 2001–02 season onward, a final four tournament is held to determine the Swiss Champion. SC Reinach, the 2001 champions, retained their title in the league's inaugural final four in 2002 and followed it up with a third consecutive victory in 2003. Playoffs were introduced in the 2005–06 season and the HC Lugano Ladies Team and ZSC Lions Frauen dominated in the playoff era, with one of the two teams winning the championship in all but one year since format change.

Format 
Starting from the 2010–11 season, the participating teams play against each other four times in two home-and-away rounds. At the end of the first round, the each team's total of points is cut by half. Once the second round is completed, the top ranking teams qualify for the play-offs which are in a best-of-five format, excepted the third place game played on a one-off match. The finals winner is declared Swiss Champion. Meanwhile, the teams finishing in the bottom two positions dispute a best-of-five playdown. The loser then faces the second tier champions in a best-of-three games series, the winner getting to play the following season in the top tier.

Current teams 
Seven teams are participating in the 2022–23 season:

Swiss Champions

Titles by teams

Awards

Woman of the Year 
The Woman of the Year award honours the best active Swiss player, whether she plays in the Swiss league or elsewhere. First awarded by the Swiss Ice Hockey Federation in the 2005–06 season.
 2005–06: Nicole Bullo, Ladies Team Lugano
 2006–07: Florence Schelling, ZSC Lions
 2007–08: Christine Meier, AIK Hockey (Riksserien)
 2008–09: Christine Meier, ZSC Lions
 2009–10: Claudia Riechsteiner, SC Reinach
 2010–11: Nicole Bullo, Ladies Team Lugano
 2011–12: Nicole Bullo, Ladies Team Lugano
 2013–14: Florence Schelling, ZSC Lions
 2014–15: Julia Marty, SC Reinach
 2015–16: Christine Meier, ZSC Lions
 2016–17: Lara Stalder, Linköping HC (SDHL)
 2017–18: Alina Müller, ZSC Lions
 2018–19: Alina Müller, Northeastern Huskies
 2019–20: Not awarded
 2020–21: Lara Stalder, Brynäs IF (SDHL) – runners up: Andrea Brändli (Ohio State Buckeyes), Alina Müller (Northeastern Huskies)
 2021–22: Alina Müller, Northeastern Huskies – runners up: Andrea Brändli (Ohio State Buckeyes), Lara Stalder (Brynäs IF)

Most Valuable Player 
First awarded in the 2009–10 season to the most valuable player of each team in the Swiss Championship playoff final.
 2009–10: Jessica Müller (Ladies Lugano), Jaclyn Hawkins (ZSC Lions)
 2010–11: Christine Meier (ZSC Lions), Iveta Koka (Ladies Lugano)
…

 2013–14: Sophie Anthamatten (Ladies Lugano), Christine Meier (ZSC Lions)
 2014–15: Céline Abgottspon (Ladies Lugano), Livia Altmann (ZSC Lions)
 2015–16: Sasha Ronchi (Ladies Lugano), Isabel Waidacher (ZSC Lions)
 2016–17: Evelina Raselli (Ladies Lugano), Caroline Baldin (ZSC Lions)

Others women's competitions in Switzerland

Second division (SWHL B) 

The team finishing first is declared SWHL B champion and qualifies for a best-of-three playoff against the loser of the top league playdown. The team finishing last is relegated in the lower division.

The ten teams that took part in the 2020–21 season were:

 HC Ambrì-Piotta (HCAP) Giovani (aka HCAP Girls)
 EHC Bassersdorf Ladies
 Brandis Ladies
 HC Fribourg Ladies
 GCK Lions Frauen
 SC Langenthal Damen
 EHC Sursee Damen
 HC Tramelan Ladies
 EC Wil Ladies
 EHC Zunzgen-Sissach Damen

Third division (SWHL C) 

The team finishing first is declared SWHL C champion and is promoted to SWHL B.

For the 2020–21 season, there were eleven participating teams:

 EHC Basel Hockey Ladies/KLH
 CdH Engiadina Damen
 HC Eisbären Queens
 Lausanne HC Féminin
 Neuchâtel Hockey Academy 1999
 SC Rapperswil-Jona Lady Lakers
 Sf. Imier-Sonceboz Femmes
 HC Sierre Féminin
 EHC Wallisellen Lions Frauen
 SC Weinfelden Ladies
 HC Wisle Damen

Swiss Women's Cup 
It is also called Ochsner Hockey Swiss Women Cup for sponsorship reasons.
 2005–06 – Ladies Team Lugano
 2006–07 – No cup
 2007–08 – DHC Langenthal
 2008–09 – ZSC Lions Frauen
 2009–10 – DHC Langenthal
 2010–11 – ZSC Lions Frauen
 2011–12 – ZSC Lions Frauen
 2012–13 – ZSC Lions Frauen
 2013–14 – ZSC Lions Frauen
 2014–15 – No cup
 2015–16 – ZSC Lions Frauen
 2016–17 – Ladies Team Lugano / ZSC Lions Frauen
 2017–18 – ZSC Lions Frauen

See also
 Switzerland women's national ice hockey team

References

External links
  
  
 News on women's hockey in Switzerland on European Women's Hockey Journal 
 Women's ice hockey in Switzerland  by Nick Heim 
 History of women's ice hockey in Switzerland by Barbara Müller 

Swiss Women's League
1986 establishments in Switzerland
Recurring sporting events established in 1986